The non-marine molluscs of American Samoa are a part of the fauna of American Samoa.

Freshwater gastropods

Land gastropods 

Partulidae
 Eua zebrina (Gould, 1847) – endemic
 Samoana abbreviata (Mousson, 1869) – Short Samoan tree snail – endemic
 Samoana conica – endemic
 Samoana thurstoni (Cooke & Crampton, 1930) – endemic

Zonitidae
 Trochomorpha apia (Hombron & Jacquinot, 1852) – endemic

Bivalves

See also 
 List of marine molluscs of American Samoa
 List of non-marine molluscs of the Cook Islands
 List of non-marine molluscs of Tonga
 List of non-marine molluscs of Wallis and Futuna

References 

Moll
Moll
American Samoa
American Samoa
American Samoa